The following is the discography of hide, a Japanese rock musician who first gained fame in the late 1980s as lead guitarist of the heavy metal band X Japan before starting his solo career in 1993. Prior to X Japan, hide was leader and guitarist of the heavy metal band Saber Tiger (later known as Saver Tiger), who released one self-titled EP in July 1985 and contributed to two omnibuses before ending activities. Although two compilation albums of demos and live recordings and one concert VHS would later be released in 2001, with the band credited as Yokosuka Saver Tiger.

hide made his solo debut in August 1993 on MCA Victor with the simultaneously released singles "Eyes Love You" and "50% & 50%", which were both certified gold by the Recording Industry Association of Japan (RIAJ). Although the lyrics to these two songs were written by Yukinojo Mori, all of his subsequent material was written and composed by hide himself. His first studio album, Hide Your Face, was released in early 1994, reached number nine on the Oricon chart, and was certified double platinum by the RIAJ. All vocals and guitars were performed by hide, while bass and drums were contributed by various musicians such as T. M. Stevens and Terry Bozzio.

In September 1996, hide released his second studio album, Psyence, which debuted at number one on the Oricon and was also certified double platinum by the RIAJ. It features many fewer musicians than his previous album, as hide began to also contribute almost all bass parts. With the January 1998 single "Rocket Dive", his first on Universal Victor, his solo work started being released under the moniker hide with Spread Beaver, crediting his live touring band. However, with the exception of programmer, recording engineer and co-producer I.N.A and drummer Joe, the Spread Beaver members' contributions to recorded material was limited.

hide died on May 2, 1998 of what was ruled a suicide by hanging. Eleven days later, the single "Pink Spider" was released, debuted at number one and became his first release to be certified million by the RIAJ. Later that same month, it was succeeded as number one on the Oricon by its followup, "Ever Free", which was certified double platinum. 3.2.1., the debut studio album by Zilch, a United States-based band which formed in 1996 and was fronted by hide, was released in July 1998 by Cutting Edge. It reached number 2 on the Oricon and was certified double platinum by the RIAJ. The only studio album credited to hide with Spread Beaver, Ja, Zoo, was incomplete at the time of hide's death. It was completed by I.N.A and the other members of Spread Beaver, released in November 1998, reached number two and has been certified triple platinum for sales over 1.2 million.

In the years since hide's death, numerous re-releases, compilations and previously unreleased material has been published posthumously, including the 2002 single "In Motion" and the 2014 song "Co Gal". Both of these were demos or unfinished songs that were completed by I.N.A, with the later utilizing Vocaloid technology to mimic hide's voice. hide's solo recordings have sold over 6.6 million copies.

Studio albums

Live albums

Compilation albums

Tribute and remix albums

Singles

Videos
Seth et Holth as Seth (September 29, 1993)
A Souvenir (VHS: March 24, 1994, DVD: April 4, 2001 as A Souvenir + Tell Me)
Film the Psychommunity Reel.1 (VHS: October 21, 1994, DVD: April 4, 2001, Blu-ray: September 28, 2016)
Film the Psychommunity Reel.2 (VHS: November 23, 1994, DVD: April 4, 2001, Blu-ray: September 28, 2016)
X'mas Present (December 24, 1994)
Lemoned Collected By hide (May 22, 1996, also features Zeppet Store, Vinyl and Trees of Life)
Ugly Pink Machine File 1 Official Data File [Psyence A Go Go In Tokyo] (VHS: February 26, 1997, DVD: October 18, 2000, Blu-ray: September 28, 2016)
Ugly Pink Machine File 1 Unofficial Data File [Psyence A Go Go 1996] (VHS: March 26, 1997, DVD: October 18, 2000, Blu-ray: September 28, 2016)
Seven Clips (VHS: June 21, 1997, DVD: October 18, 2000 as Seven Clips + Hurry Go Round)
hide presents Mix Lemoned Jelly (VHS: August 21, 1997, DVD: July 20, 2003 features many other artists)
Top Secret X'mas Present '97 (December 24, 1997)
His Invincible Deluge Evidence (VHS: July 17, 1998, DVD: July 20, 2000)
A Story 1998 hide Last Works (December 8, 1999) RIAJ certified Gold for sales of 100,000
Alivest Perfect Stage ＜1,000,000 Cuts hide!hide!hide!＞ (December 13, 2000)
Seventeen Clips ~Perfect Clips~ (May 3, 2001)
hide with Spread Beaver Appear!! "1998 Tribal Ja, Zoo" (September 21, 2005)
Alive! (DVD: December 3, 2008, Blu-ray: September 28, 2016)
We Love hide ~The Clips~ (DVD: December 2, 2009, Blu-ray: September 28, 2016)
hide 50th Anniversary Film: Junk Story (theatrical: May 23, 2015, DVD/Blu-ray: December 11, 2015)
hide 3D Live Movie "Psyence a Go Go" ~20 Years from 1996~ (theatrical: October 25, 2016, DVD/Blu-ray: January 25, 2017)
Hurry Go Round (theatrical: May 26, 2018, DVD/Blu-ray: December 5, 2018)

Other discography
With X Japan

With Zilch
3.2.1. (July 23, 1998)
Bastard Eyes (July 7, 1999)

With M*A*S*S
Dance 2 Noise 004 (January 21, 1993, "Frozen Bug")

With Saver Tiger
Saber Tiger (July 1985)
Heavy Metal Force III (November 7, 1985, "Vampire")
Devil Must Be Driven out with Devil (1986, "Dead Angle" and "Emergency Express")
Origin of hide Vol. 1 (February 21, 2001, compilation album)
Origin of hide Vol. 2 (February 21, 2001, compilation album)
Origin of hide Vol. 3 (February 21, 2001, VHS)

Other work
Overdoing (Tokyo Yankees, October 20, 1992, chorus)
Flowers (Issay, 1994, guitar on "Itoshi no Max")
96/69 (Cornelius, June 9, 1996, remixed "Heavy Metal Thunder")
Ultra Mix (Shonen Knife, October 22, 1997, remixed "Tower of the Sun")
Skyjin (Zilch, September 27, 2001, guitar on "Hide and Seek")

References

 

Discographies of Japanese artists
Rock music discographies
Discography